At the 1976 Summer Olympics, fourteen different artistic gymnastics events were contested, eight for men and six for women.  All events were held at the Montreal Forum in Montreal from July 18 through 23.

For the first time in Olympic competition, countries were limited to having three gymnasts in the all-around competition and two gymnasts in each apparatus final.  This was a controversial decision, which prevented many gymnasts of strong teams from competing in the finals.  In addition, for the first time the number of countries allowed to bring full teams of six gymnasts and compete in the team competition was limited to twelve.  The results of the team competition at the previous world championships determined which countries were allowed to bring teams.

Format of competition
The gymnastics competition at the 1976 Summer Olympics was carried out in three stages:

Competition I - The team competition/qualification round in which all gymnasts, including those who were not part of a team, performed both compulsory and optional exercises.  The combined scores of all team members determined the final score of the team.  The thirty-six overall highest scoring gymnasts qualified to the individual all-around competition.  The six highest scoring gymnasts on each apparatus qualified to the final for that apparatus.
Competition II - The individual all-around competition, in which those who qualified from Competition I performed exercises on each apparatus.  The final score of each gymnast was composed of half the points earned by that gymnast during Competition I and all of the points earned by him or her in Competition II.
Competition III - The apparatus finals, in which those who qualified during Competition I performed an exercise on the individual apparatus on which he or she had qualified.  The final score of each gymnast was composed of half the points earned by that gymnast on that particular apparatus during Competition I and all of the points earned by him or her on that particular apparatus in Competition III.

Each country was limited to three gymnasts in the all-around final and two gymnasts in each apparatus final.

Medal summary

Men's events

Women's events

Medal table

See also

Olympic medalists in gymnastics (men)
Olympic medalists in gymnastics (women)
1974 World Artistic Gymnastics Championships

References

External links
Official Olympic Report
www.gymnasticsresults.com
www.gymn-forum.net

 
1976 Summer Olympics events
1976
1976 in gymnastics